Below are the final standings of the Modern Pentathlon at the 2007 Pan American Games. The competition was held at Deodoro Sports Complex on July 23 and July 24.

Men

Women

External links
 2007 Pan American Games Official Site

Events at the 2007 Pan American Games
2007
Pan American Games